Psenuc dependens is a jumping spider species in the genus Psenuc that lives in South Africa. The species was previously allocated to the genus Pseudicius. It was first described in 2011.

References

Endemic fauna of South Africa
Salticidae
Spiders of South Africa
Spiders described in 2011
Taxa named by Wanda Wesołowska